Superdome is a 1978 American made-for-television drama film produced by ABC Circle Films. It premiered on ABC as part of The ABC Monday Night Movie series and was used to promote Super Bowl XII. It featured a cast of stars. It was directed by Jerry Jameson and written by Barry Oringer from a story by Oringer and Bill Svanoe.

Plot
At the Louisiana Superdome in New Orleans, the star players on the Cougars are dealing with issues beyond football. Dave Walecki is having marital difficulties, while quarterback Jim McCauley is being pursued by a shady management firm. Meanwhile, a national gambling syndicate attempts to find a way to stop the heavily favored Cougars from winning the game. All these plots are connected by the murder of several people connected to the team.

Cast
 David Janssen as Mike Shelley
 Edie Adams as Joyce
 Clifton Davis as P.K. Jackson
 Peter Haskell as Doug Collins
 Ken Howard as Dave Walecki
 Susan Howard as Nancy Walecki
 Van Johnson as Chip Green
 Donna Mills as Lainie Wiley
 Jane Wyatt as Fay Bonelli
 Tom Selleck as Jim McCauley
 Michael Pataki as Tony Sicota
 M. Emmet Walsh  as Whitley
 Vonetta McGee as Sonny 
 Bubba Smith as Moses Gordine 
 Ed Nelson as George Beldridge
 Dick Butkus as Scott Hennerson
 Les Josephson as Nick Caretta

Mystery Science Theater 3000
The film was later used on Mystery Science Theater 3000 in 1989 during the KTMA season.

Home video releases
The film was released onto VHS under the names The Super Bowl Story and Countdown to the Super Bowl. It is available on DVD. It was also released on DVD in a set called Sam Elliot/Tom Selleck Collection with Blue River, Gone to Texas, and I Will Fight No More Forever. On March 3, 2020, Superdome was released on Blu-ray by Kino Lorber, featuring a new commentary track by director Jerry Jameson and critics Howard S. Berger and Steve Mitchel.

See also
 List of television films produced for American Broadcasting Company

References

External links

Mystery Science Theater 3000 
 
 Episode guide: K15- Superdome

1978 films
1978 television films
1978 drama films
1970s English-language films
ABC network original films
American football films
Films directed by Jerry Jameson
Films set in New Orleans
Films shot in New Orleans
American drama television films
1970s American films